The Stewiacke River is a river in the Canadian province of Nova Scotia that starts at Round Lake in Pictou County and flows into the  Shubenacadie River in Colchester County running through the Stewiacke Valley.

See also
List of rivers of Nova Scotia

References 

 Stewiacke River Park
 Nova Scotia Watershed Map

Rivers of Nova Scotia